Hans Wolff (2 October 1911, Berlin – 1 June 1979) was a German film editor and director.

Selected filmography

Editor
 Playing with Fire (1934)
 The World's in Love (1935)
 Mazurka (1935)
 Court Theatre (1936)
 Tomfoolery (1936)
 Rendezvous in Wien (1936)
 Capers (1937)
 Serenade (1937)
 Bel Ami (1939)
 I Am Sebastian Ott (1939)
 Operetta (1940)
 Women Are No Angels (1943)
 Viennese Girls (1945)

Director
 Der Hofrat Geiger (1947)
 Shadows Over Naples (1951)
 Captive Soul (1952)
 I Can't Marry Them All (1952)
 At the Well in Front of the Gate (1952)
 It Was Always So Nice With You (1954)
 The Three from the Filling Station (1955)
 The Road to Paradise (1956)
 August der Halbstarke (1957)
  (1958)

Producer
 The Lightship (1963)

Actor
 The Singing House (1948) - Rotter, Manager
 Großstadtnacht (1950)
 At the Well in Front of the Gate (1952) - Kriminalkommissar (final film role)

External links

1911 births
1979 deaths
Film people from Berlin